Fujirebio is a Japanese multinational biotechnology company, founded and headquartered in Tokyo, Japan, and present locally with offices in Japan, Asia, Europe and the United States and through a large international distribution network. The company has manufacturing facilities in Japan, Europe and the United States.

Fujirebio specializes in innovation, development, manufacturing, and marketing of in vitro diagnostics (IVD) testing reagents, instruments, and software for clinical diagnostics and for research use. Fujirebio is today an H.U. Group company (listed on the Tokyo Stock Exchange - TYO: 4544).

History
Fujirebio was founded in Tokyo, Japan in 1950 under the name Fujizoki Pharmaceutical, Co., Inc. In its early days the company developed and manufactured pharmaceutical products. The company's first IVD test was launched in 1966, a TPHA kit for syphilis testing. In 1983 the company changed name to Fujirebio Inc. Between 1998 and 2010 Fujirebio acquired several specialized IVD companies, notably Centocor Diagnostics (1998), CanAg Diagnostics (2006) and Innogenetics (2010). In 2005, Fujirebio Inc. was integrated together with the commercial laboratories SRL, Inc. ("Special Reference Laboratories", established in 1970) under the holding company Miraca Holdings Inc. (which was renamed to H.U. Group Holdings, Inc. in 2020). The current company structure, Fujirebio Holdings, Inc. was created in 2017 as a parent company of Fujirebio Inc., Fujirebio Diagnostics, Inc., Fujirebio Europe N.V. and other Fujirebio group companies.
 1950: Fujirebio (formerly Fujizoki Pharmaceutical, Co., Inc.) is founded in Tokyo, Japan.
 1966: Launch of HA Ag (TPHA), the world’s first hemagglutination test for syphilis.
 1981: Established Fujirebio Taiwan Inc. 
 1987: Established Fujirebio America, Inc. (merged to Fujirebio Diagnostics, Inc.) in the United States.
 1998: Acquisition of Centocor Diagnostics of Pennsylvania, Inc. (USA, currently Fujirebio Diagnostics, Inc.), pioneer in oncology testing and developer of CA125II, CA19-9 and CA15-3.
 2006: Acquisition of CanAg Diagnostics AB (Sweden, currently Fujirebio Diagnostics AB), leader in oncology biomarker development.
 2007: Launch of CL4800 in Japan to support blood screening for the Japanese Red Cross Society (~2019).
 2008: Acquisition of Advanced Life Science Institute, Inc.
 2008: Acquisition of American Biological Technologies, Inc. (merged to Fujirebio Diagnostics, Inc.).
 2010: Acquisition of Innogenetics N.V. (Belgium, currently Fujirebio Europe N.V.), world leader in specialty molecular and immunoassay testing.
 2017: Established Fujirebio Holdings, Inc., as parent company of Fujirebio Inc., Fujirebio Diagnostics, Inc., Fujirebio Europe N.V. and other Fujirebio group companies.
 2019: Established Fujirebio Diagnostics Japan, Inc., focusing on OEM business in Japan.
 2020: Established Fujirebio China Co., Ltd.

References

Biotechnology companies of Japan
Manufacturing companies based in Tokyo
Chemical companies based in Tokyo
Japanese brands
Japanese companies established in 1950
Technology companies established in 1950